The Chengyu Ring Expressway, officially the Chengyu Region Ring Expressway and designated G93, is an expressway encircling the cities of Chongqing and Chengdu, Sichuan, in China. When complete, it will be  in length.

The highway is named using the one-character abbreviations cheng and yu, for Chengdu and Chongqing respectively.

Route
Clockwise from Chengdu, the expressway connects the following cities:
Chengdu, Sichuan
Mianyang, Sichuan
Suining, Sichuan
Chongqing
Luzhou, Sichuan
Yibin, Sichuan
Leshan, Sichuan
Ya'an, Sichuan
Back to Chengdu

Currently, sections from Mianyang to Ya'an through Chengdu and from Suining to Chongqing are complete.

References

Chinese national-level expressways
Expressways in Chongqing
Expressways in Sichuan